is a centaur and damocloid on a retrograde and highly eccentric orbit from the outer region of the Solar System. It was first observed on 14 September 2006 by the Catalina Sky Survey at the Catalina Station near Tucson, Arizona, United States. It has not been observed since 2006.

See also 
 
  – retrograde centaur, damocloid, and potential co-orbital with Saturn
  – another retrograde centaur, damocloid, and potential co-orbital with Saturn

References

External links 
 

Damocloids

Minor planet object articles (unnumbered)
Discoveries by the Catalina Sky Survey
20060914
Minor planets with a retrograde orbit